HD 34445 b is an extrasolar planet which orbits the G-type star HD 34445, located approximately 150.5 light years away in the constellation Orion. This planet was discovered in 2004 and finally confirmed in 2009. This planet has a minimum mass two-thirds that of Jupiter and orbits about 2 AU from the parent star. However this planet orbits in a very eccentric path. The planet's distance from the star ranges from 0.86 to 3.16 AU however it spends its full orbit within the star's habitable zone.

See also 
Other planets that were discovered or confirmed on November 13, 2009:
 HD 126614 Ab
 HD 24496 Ab
 HD 13931 b
 Gliese 179 b
 QS Virginis b

References 

 

Exoplanets discovered in 2004
Exoplanets detected by radial velocity
Giant planets
Orion (constellation)
Giant planets in the habitable zone